The following radio stations broadcast on AM frequency 1170 kHz: 1170 AM is a United States clear-channel frequency. Class A status is shared by three stations:  KTSB Tulsa, Oklahoma, WWVA Wheeling, West Virginia and KJNP in North Pole, Alaska.

In Argentina 
 LRA29 in San Luis
 Mi Pais in Hurlingham, Buenos Aires

In China 
 CNR The Voice of China

In Mexico 
 XERT-AM in Reynosa, Tamaulipas

In the Philippines 
 DZCA, in Manila
 DXMR, in Zamboanga City

In Slovenia 
 Radio Capodistria in Koper

In the United Kingdom 
 Greatest Hits Teesside in Teesside
 Greatest Hits Radio in the Midlands

In the United States 
Stations in bold are clear-channel stations.

References

Lists of radio stations by frequency